Tuddenham St Martin or Tuddenham is a small village within the Suffolk countryside, lying just outside Ipswich, on the River Fynn. The village contains "The Fountain" restaurant as well as the church of St Martin in which lies the final resting place of artist Carl Giles and his wife Joan.

The village has its own magazine called The Tuddenham Tattler.

The social calendar includes "The Tuddenham TADPOLE's (Tuddenham Amateur Dramatic People Of Little Experience) Pantomime", the Village Féte, the Safari Supper and several Parish Picnics.

It was a part of the old Hundreds of Suffolk of Carlford.

References

External links
The Tuddenham Tattler

Villages in Suffolk
Civil parishes in Suffolk